The 2021 Copa Libertadores final stages were played from 13 July to 27 November 2021. A total of 16 teams competed in the final stages to decide the champions of the 2021 Copa Libertadores, with the final played in Montevideo, Uruguay at Estadio Centenario.

Qualified teams
The winners and runners-up of each of the eight groups in the group stage advanced to the round of 16.

Seeding

Starting from the round of 16, the teams are seeded according to their results in the group stage, with the group winners (Pot 1) seeded 1–8, and the group runners-up (Pot 2) seeded 9–16.

Format

Starting from the round of 16, the teams play a single-elimination tournament with the following rules:
In the round of 16, quarter-finals and semi-finals, each tie is played on a home-and-away two-legged basis, with the higher-seeded team hosting the second leg (Regulations Article 2.2.3.2). If tied on aggregate, the away goals rule will be used. If still tied, extra time will not be played, and a penalty shoot-out will be used to determine the winners (Regulations Article 2.4.3).
The final is played as a single match at a venue pre-selected by CONMEBOL, with the higher-seeded team designated as the "home" team for administrative purposes (Regulations Article 2.2.3.5). If tied after regulation, 30 minutes of extra time will be played. If still tied after extra time, a penalty shoot-out will be used to determine the winners (Regulations Article 2.4.4).

Draw

The draw for the round of 16 was held on 1 June 2021, 12:00 PYT (UTC−4), at the CONMEBOL Convention Center in Luque, Paraguay. For the round of 16, the 16 teams were drawn into eight ties (A–H) between a group winner (Pot 1) and a group runner-up (Pot 2), with the group winners hosting the second leg. Teams from the same association or the same group could be drawn into the same tie (Regulations Article 2.2.3.2).

Bracket
The bracket starting from the round of 16 is determined as follows:

The bracket was decided based on the round of 16 draw, which was held on 1 June 2021.

Round of 16
The first legs were played on 13–15 July, and the second legs were played on 20–22 July and 3 August 2021.

|}

Match A

Flamengo won 5–1 on aggregate and advanced to the quarter-finals (Match S1).

Match B

Tied 0–0 on aggregate, Atlético Mineiro won on penalties and advanced to the quarter-finals (Match S2).

Match C

Palmeiras won 2–0 on aggregate and advanced to the quarter-finals (Match S3).

Match D

Fluminense won 3–0 on aggregate and advanced to the quarter-finals (Match S4).

Match E

Barcelona won 3–2 on aggregate and advanced to the quarter-finals (Match S4).

Match F

São Paulo won 4–2 on aggregate and advanced to the quarter-finals (Match S3).

Match G

River Plate won 3–1 on aggregate and advanced to the quarter-finals (Match S2).

Match H

Tied 0–0 on aggregate, Olimpia won on penalties and advanced to the quarter-finals (Match S1).

Quarter-finals
The first legs were played on 10–12 August, and the second legs were played on 17–19 August 2021.

|}

Match S1

Flamengo won 9–2 on aggregate and advanced to the semi-finals (Match F1).

Match S2

Atlético Mineiro won 4–0 on aggregate and advanced to the semi-finals (Match F2).

Match S3

Palmeiras won 4–1 on aggregate and advanced to the semi-finals (Match F2).

Match S4

Tied 3–3 on aggregate, Barcelona won on away goals and advanced to the semi-finals (Match F1).

Semi-finals
The first legs were played on 21 and 22 September, and the second legs were played on 28 and 29 September 2021.

|}

Match F1

Flamengo won 4–0 on aggregate and advanced to the final.

Match F2

Tied 1–1 on aggregate, Palmeiras won on away goals and advanced to the final.

Final

The final was played on 27 November 2021 at Estadio Centenario in Montevideo.

Notes

References

External links
CONMEBOL Libertadores 2021, CONMEBOL.com

3
July 2021 sports events in South America
August 2021 sports events in South America
September 2021 sports events in South America
November 2021 sports events in South America